ʻAbd Al-ʻAlīm (ALA-LC romanization of ) is a male Muslim given name. It is built from the Arabic words ʻabd and Al-ʻAlīm, one of the names of God in the Qur'an, which give rise to the Muslim theophoric names. It means "servant of the All-knowing".

It may refer to:
Abdul Aleem Siddiqi (1892–1954), Bangladeshi Sufi teacher
Abdulalim A. Shabazz (1927–2014), American mathematician
Abdul Alim (folk singer) (1931–1974), Bengali folk musician
Abdul Alim Musa (born 1945), American Muslim activist
Issam Abdel-Tawab Abdel Alim, full name of Issam Alim, convicted in Egypt for terrorist offences
Abdul Aleem (professor) (former Vice-Chancellor of Aligarh Muslim University)

See also
Masjid Abdul Aleem Siddique, mosque in Singapore

References

Arabic masculine given names